The Gran Teatre del Liceu (English: Great Theatre of the Lyceum), known as El Liceu, is an opera house in Barcelona, Catalonia, Spain. Located in La Rambla, it is the oldest running theatre in Barcelona.

Founded in 1837 at another location, El Liceu opened at its current location on 4 April 1847. The theatre was rebuilt after two fires in 1861 and 1994 and reopened on 20 April 1862 and 7 October 1999, respectively. On 7 November 1893, on the opening night of the season, an anarchist threw two bombs into the stalls, and some twenty people were killed and many more were injured. 

Between 1847 and 1989, the Liceu was the largest opera house in Europe by capacity, with its 2,338 seats at the time.

Since 1994, the Liceu has been owned and managed by a public foundation, whose Board of Trustees comprises members representing the Ministry of Culture of the Government of Spain, the Generalitat de Catalunya, the Provincial Deputation of Barcelona and the City Council of Barcelona. The theatre has its own choir, the Cor del Gran Teatre del Liceu; symphonic orchestra, the Orquesta Simfònica del Gran Teatre del Liceu; and college of music, the Conservatori Superior de Música del Liceu.

History

Origins (1837–1847)
In 1837, the Liceo Filodramático de Montesión (Philodramatic Lyceum of Montesión, now named Conservatori Superior de Música del Liceu) was founded in Barcelona to promote musical education (hence the name "Liceo", or lyceum) and organize scenic representations of opera performed by Liceo students.

A theatre was built in the convent building — named Teatro de Montesión or Teatro del Liceo de Montesión — and plays and operas were performed, the first of which was Vicenzo Bellini's Norma (3 February 1838). The repertoire was Italian, the most performed composers being Donizetti and Mercadante as well as Bellini and Rossini. The Barcelona premiere of Hérold's Zampa was held here.

In 1838, the society changed its name to Liceo Dramático Filarmónico de S. M. la Reina Isabel II (Dramatic Philharmonic Lyceum of H.M. Queen Isabel II). Lack of space, as well as pressures brought to bear by a group of nuns (who were the former proprietors of the convent and had recovered rights to return), motivated the Liceu to leave its headquarters in 1844. The last performance there was on 8 September.

The Trinitarian convent building located in La Rambla, in the centre of the city, was purchased. The managers of the Liceu entrusted Joaquim de Gispert d'Anglí with a project to make the construction of the new building viable. Two different societies were created: a "building society" and an "auxiliary building society". Shareholders of the building society obtained the right of use in perpetuity of some theatre boxes and seats in exchange for their economic contributions. Those of the second society contributed the rest of the money necessary in exchange for property of other spaces in the building including some shops and a private club called the Círculo del Liceo.

In contrast to many other European cities, where the monarchy took on the responsibility of the building and upkeep of opera houses, the Liceu was funded by private shareholders of what would become the Societat del Gran Teatre del Liceu (Great Liceu Theatre Society), organized similarly to a trading company or societat. This is reflected in the building's architecture; for example, there is no royal box. The Queen did not contribute to the construction, so the name of the society was changed to Liceo Filarmónico Dramático, removing the Queen's name from it.

With Miquel Garriga i Roca as the architect, construction began on 11 April 1845. The theatre was inaugurated on 4 April 1847.

Opening, fire and rebuilding (1847–1862)

The inauguration presented a mixed program including the premieres of José Melchior Gomis' musical ouverture, a historical play Don Fernando de Antequera by Ventura de la Vega, the ballet La rondeña (The girl from Ronda) by Josep Jurch, and a cantata Il regio himene with music by the musical director of the theatre Marià Obiols. The first complete opera, Donizetti's Anna Bolena was presented on 17 April. 

At this point, Liceu was the biggest opera house in Europe, with 3,500 seats. Other operas performed in the Liceu during the first year were (in chronological order): I due Foscari (Verdi), Il bravo (Mercadante), Parisina d'Este (Donizetti), Giovanna d'Arco (Verdi), Leonora (Mercadante), Ernani (Verdi), Norma (Bellini), Linda di Chamounix (Donizetti) and Il barbiere di Siviglia (Rossini).

The building was severely damaged by fire on 9 April 1861, but it was rebuilt by the architect Josep Oriol Mestres and re-opened on 20 April 1862, performing Bellini's I puritani. From the old building, only the facade, the entrance hall and the foyer (Mirrors Hall) remained.

Bombing and civil war (1862–1940)

On 7 November 1893, on the opening night of the season and during the second act of Rossin's opera, Guillaume Tell, two Orsini bombs were thrown into the stalls of the opera house. Only one of the bombs exploded; some twenty people were killed and many more were injured. The attack, carried out by anarchist Santiago Salvador, deeply shocked Barcelona, becoming a symbol of the turbulent social unrest of the time. The Liceu re-opened its doors on 18 January 1894, but the seats occupied by those killed were not used for a number of years. The second bomb was displayed at the Van Gogh Museum in 2007 during an exhibition on Barcelona around 1900.

In 1909, the auditorium ornamentation was renewed. Spanish neutrality during World War I allowed the Catalan textile industry to amass enormous wealth through supplying the warring parties. The 1920s were prosperous years and the Liceu became fully established as a leading opera house welcoming leading singers, conductors and companies such as Sergei Diaghilev's Ballets Russes.

When the Second Spanish Republic was proclaimed in 1931, political instability meant that the Liceu suffered a severe financial crisis which was only overcome through subsidies from Barcelona City Council and the regional government of Catalonia. During the Spanish Civil War, the Liceu was nationalized and took the name the Teatre del Liceu – Teatre Nacional de Catalunya (Liceu Opera House – the National Theatre of Catalonia). The opera seasons were suspended. After the war, it was returned to its original owners in 1939.

"Silver Age" and crisis (1940–1980)
From 1940 to the 1960s, the seasons were high-quality ones. 1955, thanks to the creation of a special board, saw a historic event when, for the first time since its foundation, the Bayreuth Festival was staged away from its normal venue. Performances of Parsifal, Tristan und Isolde and Die Walküre with innovative stage sets by Wieland Wagner were enthusiastically received.

In the 1970s, an economic crisis affected the theatre and the privately based organisation could not afford the increasing budgets of modern opera productions and general quality declined.

New direction and second fire (1980–1994)
In 1981, the Generalitat de Catalunya, with Barcelona's City Council and the Societat del Gran Teatre del Liceu, created the Consorci del Gran Teatre del Liceu (Consortium of the Great Liceu Theater) responsible for the theatre's management.

The Deputation of Barcelona and the Spanish Ministry of Culture joined the Consortium in 1985 and 1986 respectively. The Consortium managed to quickly attract the public back to the Liceu owing to a considerable improvement in its artistic standard. This included a more complete and up-to-date perspective of the very nature of an opera performance, a great improvement in the choir and orchestra, careful casting, and attracting the interest of the public to other aspects of productions besides the leading roles alone. This approach, coupled with the new economic support and a more demanding and discerning public, resulted in a high standard of productions.

The seasons organised by the Consortium maintained high standards in casting, production and public loyalty, as measured by public attendance, but all this came to a halt with a fire on 31 January 1994. The building was destroyed by a fire caused by a spark that accidentally fell on the curtain during a routine repair. At this time, Paul Hindemith's Mathis der Maler was performing at the theatre and the following opera to be performed was Puccini's Turandot.

Public and institutional response was unanimous on the need to rebuild a new opera house on the same site with improved facilities. The new Liceu is the result of a series of actions to preserve those parts of the building unaffected by the fire, the same ones as had survived the fire in 1861. The auditorium was rebuilt with the same layout, except for the roof paintings which were replaced with new art works by Perejaume, and state-of-the-art stage technology.

To rebuild and improve the theatre, it became public. The Fundació del Gran Teatre del Liceu (Liceu Great Theater Foundation) was created and the Societat del Gran Teatre del Liceu handed over the ownership of the building to the Foundation. Some owners disagreed with the decision, which was unsuccessfully challenged in court.

Reopening (1994–present)

From 1994 until its reopening in 1999, the opera seasons in Barcelona took place in Palau Sant Jordi arena (some large-scale performances in 1994), Palau de la Música Catalana, and Teatre Victòria. The rebuilt, improved and expanded theatre opened on 7 October 1999, with Puccini's Turandot, the opera that had been next on the program at the time of the 1994 fire. The new venue had the same traditional horseshoe-shaped auditorium as before but with greatly improved technical, rehearsal, office and educational facilities, a new rehearsal hall, a new chamber opera and small performances' hall, and much more public space. Architects for the rebuilding project were Ignasi de Solà-Morales and Xavier Fabré i Lluís Dilmé.

Surtitles, projected onto a screen above the proscenium, are used for all opera performances and some lieder concerts. The electronic libretto system provides translations (into English, Spanish or Catalan) onto small individual monitors for most of the seats.

During the COVID-19 pandemic in 2020, the opera house marked Spain's lifting of regulations by playing for an audience of 2,292 plants. The event was livestreamed on social media. Each plant was then donated to healthcare workers at the Hospital Clinic of Barcelona.

Opera house building
The theatre is in La Rambla, in downtown Barcelona. The building has only two facades as the other two sides were limited, until 1994, by residential buildings.

Some parts of the first building remain:
The main facade in la Rambla (1847).
The hall and the staircase (1861), with a Vallmitjana's statue of the Music (1901).
The foyer (Saló de Miralls or Mirrors Hall) (1847). It preserves romantic ornamentation with round paintings of musicians, singers and dancers from that time of Pasta, Rubini, Donizetti, Bellini, Gluck, Marie Taglioni. It was partially redecorated in 1877 by Elies Rogent and the roof painting, with the Parnassus, is from this period.

The auditorium was rebuilt after the 1994 fire; it is a faithful recreation of the 1861 auditorium, with some improvements. It has a seat capacity of 2,292, making it one of the largest opera houses in Europe. It is a typical Italian horseshoe-shaped theatre. Maximum length and width are 33 and 27 metres. There is a platea (main floor) and five tiers (or balconies). Boxes, with small rooms attached, are in the fore stage, in the platea and in some galleries. There is no significant physical divisions among boxes: only a low screen separates one box from another. No columns are in the theatre apart from inside the platea giving the appearance of the galleries of a golden horseshoe without visual interruptions. Another peculiarity is in the first gallery where the amfiteatre ubicare is located. This is a projecting part of this gallery, with a less pronounced horseshoe shape, that allows three ranks of seats to be located there and are considered the best in the theatre.

Building expenses were covered by the sale of boxes and seats. Boxes were lavishly decorated by their owners but they disappeared in the 1994 fire. Upper balconies (4th and 5th tiers) are the cheapest seats and are called the galliner (literally "henroost").

The fore stage, or proscenium, reproduces the old one which was rebuilt in 1909. It has a big central arch with two Corinthian columns on both sides and, among the columns, four tiers of boxes parapets with the wider and more luxurious boxes in the theatre being called banyeres (literally "bathtubs").

The auditorium ornamentation reproduces that of 1909: sumptuous with golden and poly chromed plaster moldings, as usual in 19th-century European theatres. Lamps are of brass and glass in the shape of a drake. Armchairs on the main floor are made of strained iron and red velvet.

In the rebuilding some modern features were introduced. The eight circular paintings in the roof, and the three in the fore stage, were all lost in the fire and have been re-created by contemporary artist Perejaume. The stage curtain is a work of the Catalan designer . The new hemispheric lamp in the center of the roof is a platform for technological facilities (lighting, sound and computer).

Other technological facilities are control and projecting cabins in some balconies, a "technical floor" over the roof, and high-tech equipment to record and broadcast performances. With computerized cameras, the auditorium could also be used as a television set. Stage facilities are among the most modern and allow quick scene changes and to perform four different sets simultaneously.

A new foyer has been built under the main auditorium. It is a room where the main bar and the restaurant are located and is also used to stage concerts, small format performances, lectures, cultural activities, and meetings etc.

The adjacent Liceu metro station of the Barcelona Metro line 3 is named after the theatre.

Artistic history

Performed works

At present, the Liceu is both a receiving and producing house, with two or three new productions staged each year. The Liceu company consists of a permanent orchestra and choir and some singers for the supporting roles. Leading roles are usually sung by guest singers. Stagecraft is in part produced internally by the theatre (alone or together with other opera houses) and also rented from other external houses. Until the 1990s, Liceu had its ballet company which was at its best in the 1920–1930s under Joan Magriñà.

Most of the performed operas were from the Italian and German schools of the 19th century: Verdi, Wagner, Belcanto authors and in more recent times Puccini, Richard Strauss and Mozart are included.

The history of Liceu premieres is a good instance of the evolution of European opera tastes. At first opera was only a part of the artistic activities and opera alternated with other forms of performance such zarzuela (Spanish light opera), classical dance (Giselle was given its first Barcelona performance in 1847), theatrical performances, magic shows and numerous activities which today might appear more appropriate for a variety concert or a music hall.

The first performed operas, Donizetti's Anna Bolena and Verdi's I due Foscari, are symptomatic of the taste for belcanto and Italian romantic melodrama: Rossini, Donizetti, Bellini, and Verdi etc. They are still in the repertory, and Verdi is by far the most performed composer.

The first operas by non-Italian composers which were put on in the Liceu were Ferdinand Hérold's Zampa (1848), Carl Maria von Weber's Der Freischütz (1849), Giacomo Meyerbeer's Robert le diable, Auber's La muette de Portici (1852) and Fra Diavolo (1853). These were sung in Italian as was the custom of the time.

The first performances of Il trovatore (1854) and La traviata (1855) led to the crowning of Giuseppe Verdi as the king of opera. In 1866 Mozart was staged at the Liceu for the first time with Don Giovanni.

1883 is a landmark when Wagner's Lohengrin is first performed. From there, and especially from the 1880s to 1950s, Wagner become one of the most beloved and highly regarded composers at Liceu. The theatre had the first staged performance of Parsifal outside Bayreuth on 31 December 1913, after the Bayreuth monopoly ended (although performance started 30 minutes before the deadline of 00:00 on 1 January 1914) with Francesc Viñas in the title role and conducted by Franz Beidler. In 1955, the Bayreuth Festival company visited the theatre and performed three operas.

Verismo, especially Puccini, is an esteemed school from the end of 19th century. The first Russian opera was given in 1915 with a great success; Mussorgsky, Rimsky-Korsakov and Tchaikovsky being often performed. The first years of the 20th century saw Richard Strauss conducting his works. In 1904, Siegfried Wagner conducted a concert and a year afterwards Pietro Mascagni conducted a work.

In 1915, impresario Mestres Calvet broadened the repertory and introduced composers such as Mozart, Richard Strauss, de Falla, Stravinsky, etc.  It was a golden age for Russian and German operas which were now sung in their original language. Mestres also was closely associated with the success commencing in 1917 with the ballets of Diaghilev, with Nijinsky, Massine, Lopokova, Chernicheva and other great figures. Years later another famous dancer, Anna Pavlova, was also to perform here.

In 1947, the directing company changed and came into the hands of Arquer and Pàmias. In contrast with the preceding years, which had been marked by the almost exclusive programming of the great repertory works, the first season of the new directorship saw a special renewal of the repertoire featuring the first performances in Barcelona of some 100 works by numerous composers. Various revivals featured Donizetti's Anna Bolena, which had first been staged in the Liceu one hundred years earlier. For 33 years, Pàmias was the leading figure of the Liceu's activity during a period when it seemed that it would be impossible to maintain the opera house without any official aid.

From the 1950s to the present, the repertory has largely comprised the most performed titles in the world, including practically all the great 20th-century composers: Bartók, Honegger, Gershwin, Berg, Janáček, Weill, Shostakovich, Prokofiev, Britten, Schönberg, Hindemith, etc., along with Baroque and classical composers Monteverdi, Handel and Gluck.

Ballet seasons are an important part of the theatre's activities with some of the best known companies in the world performing, including Diaghilev and Béjart.

Most performed operas
Most performed operas in the history of Liceu are (in January 2009):

Verdi's Aida, with 442 performances from 1877 to 2008.
Verdi's Rigoletto with 359 performances from 1853 to 2005.
Gounod's Faust with 297 performances from 1864 to 1988.
Donizetti's Lucia di Lammermoor with 274 performances from 1849 to 2007.
Donizetti's La favorita with 263 performances from 1850 to 2002 (last 10 performances are from the French version)
Verdi's Il trovatore with 259 performances from 1854 to 1993.
Wagner's Lohengrin with 241 performances from 1883 to 2006.
Puccini's La bohème with 238 performances from 1898 to 2001.
Rossini's Il barbiere di Siviglia with 233 performances from 1847 to 1991.
Verdi's La traviata with 231 performances from 1855 to 2002.
Meyerbeer's Les Huguenots with 228 performances from 1856 to 1971 (mostly in Italian version).
Bizet's Carmen with 205 performances from 1888 to 1993.
Boito's Mefistofele with 195 performances from 1880 to 1988.
Meyerbeer's L'Africaine with 191 performances from 1866 to 1977 (mostly in Italian version).
Wagner's Die Walküre with 182 performances from 1899 to 2008.

Premieres at the theatre
As a prominent theatre the Liceu has been the location for the premieres of several works of theatre and music, and for the Spanish premieres of many musical works. Among these premieres are:

1847 (4 April) Ventura de la Vega's history play Don Fernando de Antequera.
1851 (June) El granuja, zarzuela with music by N. Gardyn.
1853 (8 January)  Temistocle Solera's Spanish opera La hermana de Pelayo; La tapada del retiro, Nicolau Manent's zarzuela; Sueño y realidad, zarzuela with music by Felipe Pedrell.
1854 (16 February)  J. Freixas' opera La figlia del deserto.
1857 (23 May)  Nicolau Manent's opera Gualtero di Monsonís.
1858 Pujadas' Catalan zarzuela Setze jutges (Sixteen judges), the first all-Catalan language play performed at Liceu.
1858  Juan Garín, o, Las peñas de Montserrat, music by Mariano Soriano Fuertes, Nicolau Manent and Francisco Porcell
1859 (12 May) Nicolau Guanyabéns' opera Arnaldo d'Erill.
1859 Josep Anselm Clavé's Catalan zarzuela L'aplec del Remei.
1867 (23 March) Francesc Sánchez Gavagnach's opera Rahabba.
1874 (28 January) Marià Obiols' opera Editta di Belcourt.
1874 (14 April) Felipe Pedrell's opera L'ultimo Abenzerraggio.
1878 (27 November)  Salvatore Auteri-Manzocchi's opera Il negriero
1885 (6 June)  Manuel Giró's opera Il rinnegato Alonso García
1885 (12 June)  Antoni Baratta's opera Lo desengany, first Catalan language opera sung at Liceu.
1889 (10 July) Francesc Sánchez Gavagnach's opera La messagiera.
1892 (14 May) Tomás Bretón's opera Garín.
1895 (8 May) Isaac Albéniz's opera Henry Clifford.
1896 (5 January) Isaac Albéniz's opera Pepita Jiménez.
1902 (4 January) Felipe Pedrell's grand-opera Els Pirineus.
1903 (3 December) Joan Manén's opera Acté.
1906 (20 January) Enric Morera's opera Empòrium.
1906 (21 April) Enric Morera's opera Bruniselda.
1907 (21 January) Joan Lamote de Grignon's opera Hesperia.
1912 (17 January)  Enric Morera's Titaina, with libretto by Àngel Guimerà.
1913 (15 January) Jaume Pahissa's first opera Gal·la Placídia.
1913 Jesús Guridi's opera Mirentxu (premiered as zarzuela in 1910, at Bilbao, and revised as opera by the author)
1916 (18 January)  Enric Morera's opera Tassarba.
1919 (15 February) Jaume Pahissa's opera La morisca.
1920 (24 January)  Joaquim Cassadó's Lo monjo negre.
1923 (31 March) Jaume Pahissa's Marianela.
1924 (20 December) A. Marqués' opera Sor Beatriu.
1927 (12 January) Facundo de la Viña's opera La espigadora.
1928 (28 February) Jaume Pahissa's La princesa Margarida.
1929 (12 February) Ricard Lamote de Grignon's ballet Somnis.
1929 (14 December) Jose Maria Usandizaga's opera Las golondrinas (premiered as zarzuela in 1914 and revised as opera by Ramón Usandizaga)
1932 (3 March) Joan Manén's opera Neró i Acté.
1935 (15 January) Joan Gaig's opera El estudiante de Salamanca.
1938 Salvador Bacarisse's ballet Corrida de feria.
1948 (10 January) Xavier Montsalvatge's children opera El gato con botas.
1948 (10 January) Carlos Surinach's opera El mozo que casó con mujer brava.
1950 (14 December) Conrado del Campo's opera Lola la Piconera.
1952 (12 December) Joan Manén's opera Soledad; his ballet Rosario la Tirana.
1953 (21 May) Antoni Massana's Canigó, the first Catalan-language opera after the Civil War.
1955 (17 December) Ángel Barrios' opera La Lola se va a los puertos.
1955 (19 December) Joaquín Rodrigo's ballet Pavana real.
1956 (28 April) Frederic Mompou and Xavier Montsalvatge's ballet Perlimplinada.
1959 (1 January) Joan Altisent's opera Amunt!.
1960 (17 November) Ricard Lamote de Grignon's opera La cabeza del dragón (written in 1939).
1960 (1 May) Cristóbal Halffter's ballet Jugando al toro; Matilde Salvador's ballet El segoviano esquivo
1961 (24 November) Manuel de Falla and Ernesto Halffter's scenic cantata Atlàntida.
1962 (11 December) Xavier Montsalvatge's opera Una voce in off.
1969 (1 February) Joan Guinjoan's ballet Els cinc continents.
1974 (19 January) Matilde Salvador's opera Vinatea.
1975 (29 November) J. Ventura Tort's opera Rondalla d'esparvers.
1986 (22 May) Josep Soler's opera Oedipus et Iocasta (premiered as oratorio at Palau de la Música Catalana, 1972).
1988 (21 September) Xavier Benguerel's scenic cantata Llibre vermell.
1989 (24 September) Leonardo Balada's opera Cristóbal Colón.
2000 (2 October) José Luis Turina's opera D.Q., Don Quijote en Barcelona, with settings by La Fura dels Baus.
2004 (3 November) Joan Guinjoan's opera Gaudí.
2006 (6 April) Josep Mestres Quadreny's camera opera El ganxo.
2009 (20 April) Enric Palomar's opera La cabeza del Bautista.

Spanish opera premieres
The Liceu has also been the location for the Spanish premieres of prominent operas. Among them are:

1847  Giuseppe Verdi's Giovanna d'Arco (1845).
1848  Saverio Mercadante's  Orazi e  Curiazi (1846).
1849  Carl Maria von Weber's Der Freischütz(1821); Giuseppe Verdi's Alzira (1847); Gaetano Donizetti's Les martyrs (1840, in Italian).
1853  Daniel-François Auber's Fra Diavolo (1830).
1854  Giuseppe Verdi's Il trovatore (1853).
1856  Giuseppe Verdi's Les vepres siciliennes (1855, 1856), in Italian; Giacomo Meyerbeer's Les huguenots (in Italian) (1836).
1861  Giuseppe Verdi's Un ballo in maschera (1859).
1862  Giuseppe Verdi's Simon Boccanegra (1857).
1863  Giacomo Meyerbeer's Le prophète (in Italian) (1849).
1864  Charles Gounod's Faust (1859).
1868  Giacomo Meyerbeer's Dinorah (in Italian) (1859).
1870  Giuseppe Verdi's Don Carlos (1868, Italian version 1869).
1875  Giuseppe Verdi's Requiem (1874); Ambroise Thomas's Mignon (1866).
1876  Carlos Gomes' Il guarany (1870).
1880  Arrigo Boito's Mefistofele (1868, rev. 1875).
1883  Amilcare Ponchielli's La Gioconda (1876).
1885  Richard Wagner's Die fliegende Höllander (1843).
1887  Richard Wagner's Tannhäuser (1845, 1861).
1891  Pietro Mascagni's Cavalleria rusticana (1890).
1894  Pietro Mascagni's L'amico Fritz (1891); Jules Massenet's Manon (1884).
1897  Camille Saint-Saëns's Samson et Dalila (1877).
1898  Giacomo Puccini's La bohème (1896); Umberto Giordano's Andrea Chénier (1896).
1899  Richard Wagner's Tristan und Isolde (1865); Jules Massenet's Werther (1892).
1900  Umberto Giordano's Fedora(1898); Pietro Mascagni's Iris (1898); Richard Wagner's Siegfried (1876); Christoph Willibald Gluck's Iphigénie en Tauride (1779).
1901  Richard Wagner's Götterdammerung(1876); Engelbert Humperdinck's Hänsel und Gretel (1893).
1903  Francesco Cilea's Adriana Lecouvreur (1902).
1904  Gustave Charpentier's Louise (1900).
1905  Jules Massenet's Thaïs (1894); Richard Wagner's Die Meistersinger von Nürnberg (1868).
1907  Pietro Mascagni's Amica (1905).
1908  Camille Saint-Saëns's Les barbares(1901).
1910  Richard Strauss' Salome (1905); Eugen d'Albert's Tiefland (1903) (sung in Catalan).
1911  Claude Debussy's L'Enfant prodigue (1884).
1913  Richard Wagner's Parsifal (1883).
1915  Giacomo Puccini's La fanciulla del West (1914); Modest Mussorgsky's Boris Godunov (1869).
1916  Ermanno Wolf-Ferrari's Il segreto di Susanna (1909); Wolfgang Amadeus Mozart's Le nozze di Figaro (1786).
1919  Jules Massenet's Le jongleur de Notre-Dame (1902); Pietro Mascagni's Guglielmo Rattcliff (1895)
1920  Pietro Mascagni's Isabeau (1911).
1921  Richard Strauss' Rosenkavalier (1911); Vincent d'Indy's L'étranger (1901).
1922  Nikolai Rimsky-Korsakov's Schneguroschka (1885); Alexander Borodin's Prince Igor (1890); Pyotr Ilyich Tchaikovsky Pikovaia dama (1890).
1923  Modest Mussorgsky's Khovanshchina (1886, 1913 first Western performance).
1924  Antonín Dvořák's Rusalka (1900); Bedřich Smetana's Prodaná nevesta (1866, The bartered bride); Jacques Offenbach's Les contes d'Hoffmann (1881); Jules Massenet's Hérodiade (1881).
1925  Umberto Giordano's La cena delle beffe (1924); Richard Strauss' Intermezzo (1924); Wolfgang Amadeus Mozart's Die Zauberflöte(1791).
1926  Riccardo Zandonai's Francesca da Rimini (1914); Nikolai Rimsky-Korsakov's The legend of the invisible city of Kitezh (1907), (first performance out of Russia), Pskovityanka (1873, 1892) and May night (1879).
1927  Zoltán Kodály's Háry János suite (orchestral suite from opera Háry János)
1928  Igor Stravinsky's ballet La sacre du printemps (1913); Giacomo Puccini's Turandot (1926); Wolfgang Amadeus Mozart's Die Entfuhrung aus dem Serail (1782).
1929  Jules Massenet's Don Quichotte (1910).
1930  Italo Montemezzi's L'amore dei tre re (1913).
1933  Igor Stravinsky's Oedipus rex (1927).
1936  Antonín Dvořák's Jakobin (1897, rev.).
1939  Enric Granados's Goyescas (1916).
1943  Richard Strauss' Ariadne auf Naxos (1912).
1948  Giacomo Puccini's Il trittico (1918); Ottorino Respighi's La fiamma (1934); Igor Stravinsky's Le rossignol (1914).
1949  Richard Strauss' Elektra (1909); Édouard Lalo's Le roi d'Ys (1888).
1951  Richard Strauss' Die Frau ohne Schätten (1918).
1952  Gian Carlo Menotti's The consul (1950).
1953  Riccardo Zandonai's I cavalieri di Ekebù (1925).
1954  Gian Carlo Menotti's Amelia al ballo (1937); Béla Bartók's Duke Bluebeard's castle (1919); Giacomo Puccini's La rondine (1920, 1924).
1955  Ildebrando Pizzetti's Debora e Jaele(1921); George Gershwin's Porgy and Bess(1935); Pyotr Ilyich Tchaikovsky's Eugene Onegin (1879).
1956  Henry Purcell's Dido and Aeneas (1689).
1957  Ottorino Respighi's Maria Egiziaca (1932); Gian Carlo Menotti's The saint of Bleecker Street (1955).
1958  Ildebrando Pizzetti's Assassinio nella catedrale (1958); Carl Orff's Die Kluge (1943).
1959  Francis Poulenc's Dialogues des Carmelites(1959); Franco Alfano's Cyrano de Bergerac (1936).
1962   Richard Strauss' Arabella (1932).
1963  Wolfgang Amadeus Mozart's La clemenza di Tito (1791).
1964  Alban Berg's Wozzeck (1925); Georg Friedrich Haendel's Giulio Cesare (1724).
1965  Dmitri Shostakovich's Katerina Izmailova (1956); Leoš Janáček's Jenůfa (1904).
1966  José Pablo Moncayo's La mulata de Córdoba (1948); Luis Sandi's Carlota; Salvador Moreno's Severino; Alfredo Keil's A serrana (1899); Francis Poulenc's La voix humaine (1959); Henri Busser's La carrosse du Saint-Sacrement; Ruggero Leoncavallo's La bohème (1896).
1969  Igor Stravinsky's The Rake's Progress (1962); Alban Berg's Lulu (1938); Mikhail Glinka's One life for the Tsar.
1971  Kurt Weill's Mahagonny.
1972  Bohuslav Martinu's A Greek Passion; Bedřich Smetana's Dalibor.
1973  Leoš Janáček's Katia Kabanova; Gaetano Donizetti's Caterina Cornaro.
1975  Benjamin Britten's Billy Budd (1941); Nino Rota's Il cappello di paglia di Firenze; Gian Francesco Malipiero's Il capitano Spavento; Igor Stravinsky's Mavra.
1976  Leoš Janáček's From the Dead House.
1977  Sergei Prokofiev's War and Peace; Hector Berlioz's Benvenuto Cellini; Luigi Cherubini's Medea.
1985  Arnold Schoenberg's Moses und Aaron.
1987  Alban Berg's Lulu (Friedrich Cerha's completed version, 1979); Wolfgang Amadeus Mozart's Lucio Silla.
1991  Richard Strauss' Capriccio (1942).
1992  Philip Glass' Einstein on the Beach (1976); János Vajda's Mario and the magician.
1994  Paul Hindemith's Mathis der Maler (1938).
1999  Leoš Janáček's Vec Makropoulos.
2000  Ermanno Wolf-Ferrari's Sly.
2001  Benjamin Britten's Gloriana.
2002  Dmitri Shostakovich's Lady Macbeth de Mtsenk (original version) (1934); Gaetano Donizetti's La favorite French version (1850).
2003  Philippe Boesmans' Wintermärchen (1999).
2004  Jules Massenet's Cléopâtre (1914).
2005  Benjamin Britten's A Midsummer Night's Dream (1960); Giuseppe Verdi's Il corsaro (1848); Gioacchino Rossini's La gazzetta (1816).
2006  Erich Wolfgang Korngold's Die tote Stadt; Georg Friedrich Haendel's Ariodante (1735).
2007  Hans Werner Henze's Boulevard Solitude(1952); Jules Massenet's Le portrait de Manon (1894); Giuseppe Verdi's Don Carlos French original version (1868).
2008  Benjamin Britten's Death in Venice; L'ape musicale (1789), pasticcio by Lorenzo da Ponte with music by Mozart, Vicente Martín y Soler, Giuseppe Gazzaniga, Domenico Cimarosa, Giordani and Tarchi.
2009  Karol Szymanowski's Król Roger (1926); Héctor Parra's Hypermusic prologue (2009).
2010  George Benjamin's Into the little hill (2006).
2011  Agustí Charles Lord Byron: un estiu sense estiu (2011); György Ligeti's Le Grand Macabre (1978).
2013  Kurt Weill's Street Scene (1946).

Directors, orchestra, and company
The theatre is managed by a general director or intendant (empresari or administrador). From 1980 there is also an artistic director (director artistic).

General directors:
Albert Bernis (1901–1911)
Francesc Casanovas (1911–1913)
Alfredo Volpini (1913–1914)
Joan Mestres i Calvet (1915–1947)
Josep F. Arquer (to 1959) & Joan Pàmias, (1947–1980)
Lluís Portabella (1981–1986)
Josep M. Busquets (1986–1992)
Jordi Maluquer (1992–1993)
Josep Caminal (1993–2005)
Rosa Cullell (2005–2008)
Joan Francesc Marco (from 2008).

Artistic directors:
 (1947–1952)
Lluís Andreu (1981–1990)
Albin Hänseroth (1990–1996)
Joan Matabosch (1996–2014)
Christina Scheppelmann (2014–2019).

Orchestra and conductors
The theatre has had its own orchestra from its foundation in 1847, the Orquestra Simfònica del Gran Teatre del Liceu. It is the oldest still working orchestra in Spain. Its first conductor was Marià Obiols.

Orchestra music directors and chief conductors:

 Ernest Xancó (1959–1961)
 Eugenio Marco (1981–1984)
 Uwe Mund (1987–1994)
 Bertrand de Billy (1999–2004)
 Sebastian Weigle (2004–2008)
 Michael Boder (2008–2012)
 Josep Pons (2012–present)

The current music director of the company is Josep Pons, since 2012.  In November 2017, the Liceu announced the extension of Pons' contract through the 2021–2022 season.

Choir conductors
The choir was consolidated during the 1960s by its conductor Riccardo Bottino (1960–1982). The present choir conductor is William Spaulding.

Stage directors and stagecraft
During the second half of the 19th century, a school of stagecraft and theatrical scenery was developed at the Liceu. After the beginnings with Joan Ballester, well known for his setting for L'Africaine, the leading scenographer was Francesc Soler i Rovirosa, working in the 1880–1900s. The style was very realistic using painted paper flats and curtains. Settings and costumes were made in the theatre workshops. From the 1900s to 1930s the school is represented by scenic painters including Maurici Vilomara, Fèlix Urgellés, Salvador Alarma and Oleguer Junyent. The last of these painters was Josep Mestres Cabanes who painted sceneries in the 1930–1950s.

Singers

Many famous singers have sung at the Liceu. Composer Camille Saint-Saëns, when visiting the Liceu, once said: "Ils aiment trop the ténor" (They [the Liceu public] love tenors too much). In brackets are the dates of the house debuts and final/most recent performances of prominent singers who have appeared at the Liceu:

1800s: Manuela Rossi-Caccia (1847),  (1860/1862), Giuseppe Mario (1863), Roberto Stagno (1867), Rosa Vercolini, Francesco Tamagno (1876/1890), Adelaida d'Alberti, Francesc Mateu (Francesco Uetam) (1874/1877), Carolina Cepeda (1877),  (1881), Julián Gayarre (1881/1888), Victor Maurel, Francesc Viñas (1888/1913), Hariclea Darclée (1894), Luisa Tetrazzini (1896), Geneviève Vix,  (1896), Maria Barrientos (1898/1918), Rosina Storchio (1898).
1900s: In 1904 Enrico Caruso (in his only Liceu appearance) participated in two performances of Rigoletto. Gemma Bellincioni played the title role in a Salomé, the Catalan singer Conchita Supervía made her debut.  Success was recorded by other performers such as: Mario Sammarco (1902), Adamo Didur (1905), Mattia Battistini (1906), Graziella Pareto (1906/1928), Giuseppe Anselmi (1907), Titta Ruffo (1908/1926), Riccardo Stracciari (1909/1939)
1910s–1920s: Elvira de Hidalgo (1911), Ebe Stignani, Conchita Supervía (1912/1928), Hipólito Lázaro (1914/1945), Giovanni Zenatello, Giacomo Lauri-Volpi (1922/1945 and 1972) Miguel Fleta (1925/1933), Toti Dal Monte (1925/1934), Feodor Chaliapin (1927/1934), Lauritz Melchior (1927/1930), Tina Poli Randaccio, Lily Hafgren, Carlo Galeffi, Gilda Dalla Rizza, Georges Thill, Giannina Arangi Lombardi and Gina Cigna.
1940s: Giulietta Simionato (1945/1951), Victoria de los Ángeles (1945/1968 and 1994), Giuseppe Di Stefano (1946/1970 and 1986), Maria Caniglia (1947/1954), Gianni Poggi (1947/1963), Kirsten Flagstad (1949/1952), Hans Hotter (1948/1987), Max Lorenz (1950/1954)
1950s: Boris Christoff (1951/1952), Renata Tebaldi (1953/1959), Giuseppe Taddei (1953/1986), Wolfgang Windgassen (1954/1959), Walter Berry (1954/1985), Anton Dermota (1955/1966), Gianna D'Angelo (1957/1965),  (1957/1992), Fedora Barbieri, Margherita Carosio, Astrid Varnay (1955/1957), Gertrude Grob-Prandl, Birgit Nilsson (1957/1958), Régine Crespin (1958/1966), Carlo Bergonzi (1958/1982), Alfredo Kraus (1958/1994).
1960s: Joan Sutherland (1960/1989), Piero Cappuccilli (1961/1994), Fiorenza Cossotto (1961/1994), Montserrat Caballé (1962/2007), Virginia Zeani (1963/1977),  (1964/1989), Plácido Domingo (1966/2015), Jaume Aragall (1964–1997), Vicente Sardinero (1964/1997), Richard Tucker (1965/1975), Grace Bumbry (1966/1988), Anja Silja (1966/2000).
1970s: Mirella Freni (1970/1994), José Carreras (1958, as child, and 1970/2008), Joan Pons (1970/2006), Elena Obraztsova (1970/1984), Agnes Baltsa (1971/1992), Edita Gruberová (1977/2008)
1980s: Simon Estes (1981/1997), Matti Salminen (1981/2004), Ewa Podleś (1981/2007), Martti Talvela (1982/1989), Franco Bonisolli Éva Marton (1982/2006), Gwyneth Jones (1985/1997), Nicolai Ghiaurov (1985/1992), Rockwell Blake (1986/1996), Dolora Zajick (1988/2008).
1990s & 2000s:  (1992/2007), Deborah Polaski (2000), Angela Denoke (2002), Natalie Dessay, Juan Diego Flórez (2002/2008), Rolando Villazón (2005/2008), Peter Seiffert or Fiorenza Cedolins (2005/2007), Nina Stemme (2004–2005/2008–2009).

Conservatori de Música del Liceu
Linked to the theatre is the Conservatori Superior de Música del Liceu, a music college founded in 1837 which is part of the same corporation.

Círculo del Liceo

The Círculo del Liceo is an exclusive private club located in the Liceu building. The Círculo opened in November 1847, a few months after the Liceu opera house, with 125 founding members, according to its earliest records. The club's facilities include numerous elegant lounges, conference rooms, a restaurant, a library and other services. 

For the society's first 150 years, only men were permitted to become members; women were allowed access solely as guests of male society members. In 2001, following public controversy over the club's exclusively male membership, the club's constitution was amended and ten women (including renowned soprano Montserrat Caballé and several family members of existing members) were permitted to apply for membership for the first time. All ten women were initially turned down, then later admitted after a subsequent vote by members, with a final vote of 373 votes in favor and 279 against their admission. At present, the society has around one thousand members.

The Círculo del Liceo is the oldest club in Spain which retains its original location. The club's long history has enabled it to accumulate a unique heritage of artistic works. Many of its rooms are decorated in an Art Nouveau style. Four large windows in the low foyer serve as a testimony to the influence of Wagnerism in Catalan culture at the beginning of the 20th century.

In addition to the furniture and decor, the club retains a collection of sculptures, marquetry, enamels, engravings, etchings and paintings by Catalan artists: Alexandre de Riquer, Santiago Rusiñol, Modest Urgell Inglada and Francesc Miralles, among others. The most notable work belonging to the club is a set of twelve oils on fabric, commissioned to Ramon Casas and installed in the rotunda of the club. Each of the twelve paintings, Casas' most ambitious work, is inspired by a musical topic.

The Liceu in fiction, cinema, etc.

Fiction: novels, plays, etc.
 's satirical comedy "Liceístas" i "cruzados" (1865), about the quarrels among the fans of the Liceu and fans of the Teatre Principal, the two main opera houses as there was a great rivalry among them in Barcelona during the 19th century.
 Narcís Oller's novel La febre d'or (1892).
 Artur Masriera's sketch book Los buenos barceloneses: hombres, costumbres y anécdotas de la Barcelona ochocentista (1850–1870) (1925).
 's novels: Mariona Rebull (1944) and El viudo Rius (1945), where the 1893 bomb at Liceu is narrated.
 Eduardo Mendoza's novel La ciudad de los prodigios (1986). However the film based on it was filmed at Teatre Fortuny at Reus, not at Liceu.
 's short stories book El dia que es va cremar el Liceu (The day the Liceu was burnt) (1995).

Films
 Mariona Rebull (1947), directed by José Luis Sáenz de Heredia
 Gayarre (1958), by Domingo Viladomat, a biopic about Julián Gayarre, performed by Alfredo Kraus.
 Circus World (1964), directed by Henry Hathaway, with John Wayne and Claudia Cardinale; some circus scenes are filmed inside the Liceu theatre.
 Romanza final (1986), directed by José María Forqué, a film about Julián Gayarre's life with Josep Carreras.
 Un submarí a les estovalles (1990), directed by Ignasi Pere Ferré.
 La febre d'or (1993), directed by Gonzalo Herralde, with Fernando Guillén, Rosa M. Sardà and Àlex Casanovas, with fragments of a performance of Gounod's Faust.
 The Life of David Gale (2003), directed by Alan Parker, with Kevin Spacey and Kate Winslet.

See also
Conservatori Superior de Música del Liceu
List of theatres and concert halls in Barcelona

References
Notes

Sources
Alier, Roger, El gran llibre del Liceu. Barcelona: Carroggio, DL 1999.
Alier, Roger, El Gran Teatro del Liceo: historia artística. Barcelona: Francesc X. Mata, 1991.
Alier, Roger, Historia del Gran Teatro del Liceo. Barcelona: La Vanguardia, 1983.
Anuari 1947–1997 del Gran Teatre del Liceu. Recerca i recopilació: Pau Nadal. Barcelona: Amics del Liceu: Àmbit, DL 1997.
Artís, Josep, El Gran Teatro del Liceo. Col·lecció Barcelona histórica y monumental. Barcelona: Aymá, 1946.
Daufí, Alícia. "De la transgressió carnavalesca al silenci de la postguerra. Estudi musical, social, cultural i econòmic dels balls de màscares al Gran Teatre del Liceu (1848-1936)" [Unpublished doctoral dissertation]. Universitat Autònoma de Barcelona, 2022. https://ddd.uab.cat/record/266133
Crònica il·lustrada del Gran Teatre del Liceu: 1947–1997. Barcelona: Amics del Liceu : Àmbit, DL 1997.
Lloret, Teresa, Gran Teatre del Liceu, Barcelona. [Barcelona: Fundació Gran Teatre del Liceu], cop. 2002.
Òpera Liceu: una exposició en cinc actes: Museu d'Història de Catalunya, 19 setembre de 1997-11 de gener de 1998, Barcelona. [Barcelona]: Generalitat de Catalunya, Departament de Cultura : Proa : Fundació Gran Teatre del Liceu, DL 1997.
Radigales, Jaume, Els orígens del Gran Teatre del Liceu: 1837–1847: de la plaça de Santa Anna a la Rambla: història del Liceu Filharmònic d'Isabel II o Liceu Filodramàtic de Barcelona. Barcelona: Publicacions de l'Abadia de Montserrat, 1998.
Subirá, José, La ópera en los teatros de Barcelona: estudio histórico cronológico desde el siglo XVIII al XX . Monografías históricas de Barcelona, 9. Millà. 1946.
Tribó, Jaume, Annals 1847–1897 del Gran Teatre del Liceu. Barcelona: Amics del Liceu: Gran Teatre del Liceu, 2004.

External links

  

Opera houses in Spain
Theatres and concert halls in Barcelona
Ciutat Vella
La Rambla, Barcelona
Catalan music
Theatres completed in 1847
Music venues completed in 1847
Theatres completed in 1862
Music venues completed in 1862
Theatres completed in 1999
Music venues completed in 1999
1837 establishments in Spain
1847 establishments in Spain
Tourist attractions in Barcelona
Liceu